This is a list of notable Mizrahi Jews and Sephardi Jews in Israel, including both original immigrants who obtained Israeli citizenship and their Israeli descendants.

Traditionally the terms "Mizrahi Jews" and "Sephardi Jews" were used as all encompassing terms referring to the Jews descended from the Jewish communities of Iberia, North Africa and the Middle East; but due to the melting pot effect of the Israeli society the terms have gradually become more vague. Many Israeli descendants of Mizrahi and Sephardi Jewish immigrants have gradually adopted the Israeli culture and intermarried with descendants of other Jewish communities.

Government and Politicians
 Dudi Amsalem - politician, member of Likud.
 Haim Amsalem – politician. Former member of the Shas Party. In 2011 Amsalem established the Whole Nation party.
 Shlomo Ben Ami - diplomat, politician and historian
 Michael Ben-Ari – Israeli politician and current member of the Knesset 
 Binyamin Ben-Eliezer politician, held several ministerial posts, including Minister of Industry, Trade and Labour; Minister of Defense; and Deputy Prime Minister. Born in Iraq
 Aryeh Bibi - politician, Iraqi Jewish member of Knesset for Kadima. Born in Baghdad, Iraq.
 Aryeh Deri - politician, and former leader of Israel's Shas Party. Born in Meknes, Morocco.
 Yaakov Edri - Member of Knesset for Kadima.  Born In Morocco.
 Gila Gamliel - Member of the Knesset for Likud and minister
 Sharren Haskel -  member of the Knesset for Likud.
 Yoel Hasson - politician, member of Knesset for Kadima.
 Dalya Itzik - politician who serves as a member of the Knesset for Kadima
 Avigdor Kahalani - former member of the Labor Party.
 Moshe Kahlon - Kulanu Party Chairman, member of the Knesset and current Finance Minister
 Moshe Katsav – Former President of Israel (2000–2007)
 David Levy - politician who served as a member of the Knesset between 1969 and 2006
 Orly Levy – former model who is a politician
 Shaul Mofaz – Former Israeli Minister of Defense, currently number two on the Kadima list in the Knesset
 Yitzhak Mordechai - former general and former politician
 Amir Ohana Israeli lawyer, former Shin Bet official and politician who currently serves as a member of the Knesset for Likud
 Shimon Ohayon - politician. MK member for the Likud party.
 Amir Peretz - politician and member of the Knesset for the Labour Party
 Rafi Peretz (1956-) Israel Minister of Education and former Chief Military Rabbi
 Miri Regev - Member of the Knesset and minister
 Silvan Shalom - politician who previously served as Israel's Foreign Minister and Finance Minister
 Meir Sheetrit - politician who serves as a member of the Knesset for Kadima
 Robert Tiviaev- politician, Mountain Jew, current member of Knesset for Kadima. Born in Daghestan.
 Eli Yishai - politician, and current leader of Israel's Shas Party
 Mordechai Zar – Israeli politician and former member of the Knesset
 Jessica Meir - American Astronaut with NASA

Military
 Gabi Ashkenazi – Former Chief of the IDF General Staff
 Moshe Barazani - Iraqi Kurdish Jew and a member of Lehi
 Eitan Ben Eliyahu – Former Major General in the Israeli Defence Forces
 Eli Cohen – Israeli spy who worked in Syria and was eventually exposed and executed in Syria in 1965
 Gadi Eizenkot - current chief of staff of the Israel Defense Forces 
 David Elazar - Former Chief of the IDF General Staff
 Dan Halutz – Former chief of staff of the Israel Defense Forces
 Moshe Levi - Former Chief of the IDF General Staff
 Shaul Mofaz – Former Israeli Minister of Defense, Former Chief of the IDF General Staff.
 Yitzhak Mordechai - former general and former Israeli Minister of Defense

Activists

 Abie Nathan – Humanitarian and peace activist
Hen Mazzig – Writer and speaker. A senior fellow at the Tel Aviv Institute.

Religious figures

 Elazar Abuhatzeira, Orthodox Sefardi rabbi and kabbalist.
  Rabbi Amram Aburbeh, Chief Rabbi of Petah Tikva 
 Rabbi Shlomo Moshe Amar, Sephardi Chief Rabbi of Israel and Rishon LeZion
 Rabbi Shalom Arush, is an Israeli Breslov rabbi and founder of the Chut Shel Chessed Institutions. Arush is considered one of today's leading Hasidic spiritual guides. 
 Mordechai Eliyahu, Sephardi Chief Rabbi of Israel 1983–93, (1929–2010)
 Yosef Chaim HaCohen, Rabbi, Rabad, Rosh Av Beth Din Chief judge of the Ma'araviim congregation in Jerusalem :he:יוסף חיים הכהן
 Yoshiyahu Yosef Pinto, Israeli Jewish spiritual leader and Kabbalist who lives in New York City.
 Moshe Shmuel Shapira, rosh yeshiva of Be'er Yaakov
 Yosef Qafih, Yemen-born rabbi and scholar
 Rabbi Amnon Yitzhak, a Yemenite Haredi rabbi
 Ovadia Yoseph, the former Sephardi Chief Rabbi of Israel
 Rabbi-Cohen Shalomim HaLahawi, Diaspora Mizrahi Rabbi of the Mizrahi-Ethiopian Jewish Int'l Rabbinical Council; Founder of Cushite Hebrew Yeshiva-Open Int'l University. Family originally from Mt. Carmel, Israel.

Businesspeople and entrepreneurs

 Shai Agassi -  Israeli entrepreneur. The founder and CEO of Better Place, which has developed a model and infrastructure for employing electric cars as an alternative to fossil fuel technology.
 Alona Barkat owner of the football team Hapoel Be'er Sheva. Sister-in-law of former Jerusalem mayor Nir Barkat.
 Zadik Bino - Israeli businessman, owner of the First International Bank of Israel.
 Patrick Drahi - Israeli-French businessman 
 Shlomo Eliahu - Israeli businessman
 Yakir Gabay - Israeli-born billionaire who founded Aroundtown SA
 Isaac Larian - businessman
 Lev Leviev – diamond tycoon
 Haim Saban – Israeli-American television and media proprietor. Saban was ranked by Forbes as the 104th richest person in America. 
 Yitzhak Tshuva - Israeli business magnate.

Academic figures

 Michel Abitbol, historian, professor, and chair of the Department of African Studies at the Hebrew University of Jerusalem.
 Amnon Netzer – historian, researcher, professor and journalist.
 Avshalom Elitzur – physicist and philosopher
 Moshe Bar-Asher – linguist
 Smadar Lavie    - anthropologist, visiting fellow at the University of California, Berkeley 
 Maor Farid    - researcher at Massachusetts Institute of Technology, social activist and author
 Raphael Mechoulam – chemist, discoverer of tetrahydrocannabinol and anandamide

Cultural figures

Film, TV, and stage

Models

 Moran Atias – model and actress
 Sendi Bar – model and actress
 Yael Abecassis – model and actress
 Linor Abargil – Israeli beauty pageant contestant who won the Miss World beauty pageant in 1998
 Miri Bohadana – model and actress
  – model and actress
 Orly Levy – former model who is a politician
  – model and actress
  – model and actress
 Becky Griffin – model, TV presenter and an actress
 Yehuda Levi - actor and model

Popular musicians

 Shai Tsabari - singer

Various
Adi Nes – Photographer

Sports

Association Football

 Dudu Aouate – goalkeeper (RCD Mallorca, national team)
 Gai Assulin – winger/attacking midfielder (Manchester City, national team)
 Pini Balili, Israel/Turkey – striker (Bnei Yehuda Tel Aviv, national team)
 Yossi Benayoun – attacking midfielder, national team captain, Hapoel Be'er Sheva, Maccabi Haifa, Racing Santander, West Ham United, Liverpool, Chelsea
 Tal Ben Haim – center back/right back, Maccabi Tel Aviv, Bolton Wanderers, Chelsea, West Ham United
 Avi Cohen – defender, Liverpool and national team
 Yaniv Katan – forward/winger (Maccabi Haifa, national team)
 Eli Ohana – won UEFA Cup Winners' Cup and Bravo Award (most outstanding young player in Europe); national team; manager
 Haim Revivo – attacking/side midfielder (national team), Maccabi Haifa, Celta de Vigo, Fenerbahçe, Galatasaray
 Idan Tal – midfielder (Beitar Jerusalem FC & national team)
 Itzik Zohar – attacking midfielder (national team), Maccabi Jaffa, Maccabi Tel Aviv, Royal Antwerp, Beitar Jerusalem, Crystal Palace, Maccabi Haifa, Maccabi Herzliya, Maccabi Netanya, F.C. Ashdod, Hapoel Nazareth Illit

Basketball
 Omri Casspi – 6' 9" Small Forward, drafted in 1st round of 2009 NBA Draft (Cleveland Cavaliers)
 Oded Katash - 6'5" Point Guard, Israeli National Basketball Team Coach
 Motti Aroesti - 6'2" Point Guard.
 Lior Eliyahu - 6'9" Power Forward, drafted in 2nd round of 2006 NBA Draft by Orlando Magic.
 Lior Arditi  - 6'4" Point Guard.
 Doron Jamchi - 6'6" Shooting Guard.
 Shimon Amsalem - 6'8" Power Forward & Center.
 Dror Hajaj - 5'10" Point Guard.
 Yogev Ohayon - 6'2" Point Guard.
 Papi Turjeman - 6'5" Point & Shooting Guard.
 Eliahu Amiel - 6'1" Point Guard.
 Afik Nissim - 6'1" Point Guard.
 Mark Mimran - 5'11" Point Guard.

Olympic Sports Athlets
 Shahar Tzuberi, Israel, windsurfer, Olympic bronze (RS:X discipline); 2009 & 2010 European Windsurf champion

See also
 Israelis
 List of notable Israelis
 List of Jews from the Arab World

References

Lists of Jews
Jews,Israeli Mizrahi and Sephardi
Mizrahi and Sephardi Jews